Eric Richardson (born April 18, 1962) is an American former wide receiver who played for the Buffalo Bills. He played college football for San Jose State and Monterey Peninsula College. Richardson was selected by the Bills in the 2nd round of the 1984 NFL Draft. He played in 30 games and started 2 of them. Even though he was drafted in 1984, he played his first game in 1985.

References

External links 
 Pro Football Reference page

Living people
1962 births
Players of American football from San Francisco
Buffalo Bills players
American football wide receivers
San Jose State Spartans football players